Agnes Middleton Raeburn (1872-1955) was a Scottish member of the informal group of artists known as "The Immortals".

Life
Raeburn was born in Glasgow to corn merchant James Raeburn and wife Agnes in 1872. She was the youngest of six siblings, including Charles and Lucy Raeburn. Following the death of her mother when she was seven, Raeburn and her siblings were raised by their father. In 1887, at the age of 15, she obtained a place at Glasgow School of Art and she was there for five years. Her tutors included Fra Newberry. During her time at school Raeburn contributed to the student publication, The Magazine, created by Charles Rennie Mackintosh. In 1903 she became the art teacher at Laurel Bank School in Glasgow. She was involved with a Glasgow based artistic group known as "The Immortals". This group also included Janet Aitken, Margaret Macdonald Mackintosh, Jessie Newbery, Ruby Pickering, Katharine Cameron, Jessie Keppie and Frances McNair.

In 1939 she returned to teach at the Laurel Bank School and the following year she led the Glasgow Society of Lady Artists' Club as President for three years. Raeburn exhibited her art widely. She died in Edinburgh in 1955.

Works 

 Winter Sunshine, Inveran Farm
 Still Life of Violets
 Still Life: Anemones
 Still life - A Glass Vase of Pansies
 Spring, Dalry
 Richmond Castle
 Jug of Chrysanthemums
 Vase of Mixed Flowers
 A Still Life of Primroses
 The Blue Pool
 Fountain Bleau
 Still Life of Roses in a Blue Vase
 A Quiet River Bend
 A Sunny Day at Loch Earn
 Purple Pansies
 Pink Roses
 Pink-Centred Roses
 Roses and Violas

External links

References

1872 births
1955 deaths
19th-century Scottish women artists
20th-century Scottish women artists
Alumni of the Glasgow School of Art
Artists from Glasgow